Presnyakov (feminine: Presnyakova) is a Russian-language surname. It may refer to:

Presnyakov brothers
Alexander Presnyakov
Igor Presnyakov
Vladimir Presnyakov Jr. (born 1968), Russian musician, actor and composer
 (born 1946), Russian musician and composer
 (born 1946) Russian singer

Russian-language surnames